Saint-Paul (Le Marais) is a station on Paris Métro Line 1, close to the Rue Saint-Paul. It serves the neighbourhood of Le Marais, known for its Jewish and gay communities, and fine town houses.

The Jewish quarter is called Pletzl and is located around the Rue des Rosiers. The Place des Vosges and the Lycée Charlemagne are nearby.

The station was opened on 6 August 1900, 18 days after trains began running on the original section of line 1 between Porte de Vincennes and Porte Maillot on 19 July 1900.

Station layout

References
Roland, Gérard (2003). Stations de métro. D’Abbesses à Wagram. Éditions Bonneton.

Paris Métro stations in the 4th arrondissement of Paris
Railway stations in France opened in 1900